Kai-Lin Hernandez (born 1995 or 1996) is an American-born Jamaican footballer who plays as a midfielder for the Jamaica national team.

International career
Raised in the American city of Homestead, Florida, Hernandez was born to a Jamaican mother and a Colombian father. She represented Jamaica at the 2016 CONCACAF Women's Olympic Qualifying Championship qualification.

International goals
Scores and results list Jamaica's goal tally first

References

1990s births
Living people
Citizens of Jamaica through descent
Jamaican women's footballers
Women's association football midfielders
Jamaica women's international footballers
Jamaican people of Colombian descent
Sportspeople of Colombian descent
People from Homestead, Florida
Soccer players from Florida
American women's soccer players
High Point Panthers women's soccer players
African-American women's soccer players
American sportspeople of Colombian descent
American sportspeople of Jamaican descent
21st-century African-American sportspeople
21st-century African-American women